Arthur James Sherwell (11 April 1863 – 13 January 1942) was a British Liberal Party politician and temperance campaigner.

Background
He was born in London on 11 April 1863, the son of John Viney Sherwell, of Modbury, Devon. He was educated privately. He married in 1909, Amy Whadcoat of Bodiam, Sussex.

Career
Prior to entering Parliament he was occupied in sociological and politico-economic studies and literary work. Most notably in connection with the Temperance movement with his friend Joseph Rowntree with whom he published a number of works; The Temperance Problem and Social Reform [1899], Life in West London [1901], British Gothenburg Experiments [1901], The Drink Peril in Scotland [1903], Public Control of the Liquor Trade [1903], The Taxation of the Liquor Trade [1908], The Russian Vodka Monopoly, State Purchase of the Liquor Trade [1919], State Prohibition and Local Option. He travelled extensively, had been several times round the world, and had an intimate acquaintance with the United States and the British Dominions and Colonies. 
He served as Liberal Member of Parliament for Huddersfield from 1906 to 1918. He first stood for parliament at the 1906 Huddersfield by-election, following the 1906 General election when he held a seat for the Liberals. He was re-elected in both 1910 General Elections and retired from parliament just before the 1918 General election. He served on various Government Committees and Commissions. He was a member of the Sociological Society.

Sources
Who Was Who
British parliamentary election results 1885–1918, Craig, F. W. S.

References

External links 
Who Was Who; http://www.ukwhoswho.com
 Transcript of British 'Gothenburg' Experiments and Public-House Trusts  by Joseph Rowntree and Arthur Sherwell (1901)

1863 births
1942 deaths
Liberal Party (UK) MPs for English constituencies
UK MPs 1906–1910
UK MPs 1910
UK MPs 1910–1918
Temperance movement
History of Gothenburg
Alcohol in Scotland